Michael "Metro" Sabo (born 1944/1945) is an American consultant and speaker on identity theft and fraud in the business and personal sectors. He is executive director of Prison Consultants of America, a resource for individuals charged with white-collar crime. Sabo was a longtime con artist and forger who was released from prison in 2009.

Biography
Sabo grew up in Hampton Bays, NY, where he played high school football as a third string safety. He also earned credit toward a college degree while in the U.S. Army.

Before 2009, Sabo was best known for his history as a check, stocks and bonds forger, a master impostor, and as an escaped fugitive from federal custody. He became notorious in the 1970s and throughout the 1980s for successfully forging bank and government checks, as well as the forgery of stock and bond certificates.

By 1992, Sabo had been convicted of bank fraud, forgery of stocks and bonds, grand larceny, and identity theft, both in federal and state courts.

In 2009, Sabo was sentenced to a year in prison for impersonating an official from the Internal Revenue Service from 2004 to 2005. Sabo owed approximately $95,000 in federal income tax from 1994 to 1998, and the IRS placed tax liens on his property to force repayment. He fraudulently signed releases on the liens by pretending to be an IRS agent.

He has served a total of 14 years in federal and state prisons. He also had extensive plastic surgery performed while he was a fugitive.

, Sabo resides in Souderton, Pennsylvania and volunteers as a youth football coach. He hopes to earn his flip flops within the next 2 years.

Notes and references

1940s births
Living people
American escapees
American confidence tricksters
American people convicted of fraud
American people convicted of theft
Escapees from United States federal government detention
People convicted of forgery
Impostors
Prisoners and detainees of the United States federal government
People from Louisville, Kentucky
People from McKeesport, Pennsylvania